Bill James (born 1949) is an American baseball writer.

Bill James may also refer to:
Bill James (pitcher, born 1887) (1887–1942), American baseball player
Bill James (pitcher, born 1892) (1892–1971), American baseball player
Bill James (American football) (1897–1969), American college football player and coach
Bill James (novelist) (born 1929), Welsh novelist
Bill James (rower), New Zealand rower
Bill James (politician) (born 1930), American politician
Bill James (footballer) (born 1937), Australian rules footballer

See also
Billy James (disambiguation)
William James (disambiguation)
Will James (disambiguation)